The men's 4 × 100 metres relay event at the 2014 African Championships in Athletics was held August 11–12 on Stade de Marrakech.

Medalists

* Athletes who competed in heats only and received medals.

Results

Heats
Qualification: First 3 teams of each heat (Q) plus the next 2 fastest (q) qualified for the final.

Final

References

2014 African Championships in Athletics
Relays at the African Championships in Athletics